Mission Road Ground or Tin Kwong Road Recreation Ground is a multi-purpose sports field on Tin Kwong Road in Kau Pui Lung, Kowloon, Hong Kong, which is mainly used for cricket matches. It was opened in 1976, and the first match played there was between a Hong Kong XI and the Queensland Colts.

History 
In November 2015 the International Cricket Council (ICC) announced that it had approved the ground as venue for holding One Day International (ODI) matches, the venue thus becoming the first international cricket venue in East Asia 

On 26 January 2016, the ground hosted its first One Day International when the Hong Kong cricket team played against Scotland in the 2015–17 ICC World Cricket League Championship. A second scheduled ODI was washed out. On the two following days, the first two Twenty20 Internationals at the ground were played, between the same teams.

In February 2020, Interport Series was scheduled to be played at this venue but was cancelled due to the coronavirus pandemic in China. The series was then moved to Kinrara Academy Oval in Kuala Lumpur.

List of Five Wicket Hauls

One Day Internationals

References

External links 

 Cricinfo
 cricketarchive
 Wikimapia

Cricket grounds in Hong Kong
Kowloon City District
Sports venues completed in 1976
Sports venues in Hong Kong